Into the Pink is the second album by the American rock band Verbena, released in 1999. It was their first release for Capitol Records. The album included the singles "Pretty Please" and "Baby Got Shot".

Production
The album was produced by Dave Grohl. It was the band's first album as a trio, with Anne Marie Griffin changing from second guitar to bass guitar after the departure of the original bass guitarist.

Critical reception
Rolling Stone called the album "skeletal rock with gravely roughed-up guitars." Entertainment Weekly wrote: "To make their potent retro cocktail, Verbena add a dash of Iggy Pop swagger and a measure of T. Rex power chords." The Stranger thought that "the distinctly crumbly crust of grunge is detectable among the sexy hot rock this time around." The Boston Globe declared that "Verbena's grimy guitar rock, as well as the potent vocal interplay between [AA] Bondy and bassist Anne Marie Griffin, still sounds as deadly as a rattlesnake."

Track listing
All songs written by Scott Bondy and Verbena.

"Lovely Isn't Love" – 2:41
"Into the Pink" – 4:06
"Baby Got Shot" – 2:42
"John Beverly" – 3:51
"Pretty Please" – 2:51
"Monkey, I'm Your Man" – 2:38
"Prick the Sun" – 3:29
"Oh My" – 3:46
"Submissionary" – 2:26
"Bang Bang" – 2:39
"Depression Is a Fashion" – 1:52
"Sympathy Was Dead" – 2:51
"Big Skies, Black Rainbows" – 4:13

Personnel
Verbena
Scott Bondy – vocals and guitar
Anne Marie Griffin – bass guitar and vocals
Les Nuby – drums

Technical personnel
Producer: Dave Grohl
Engineer: Adam Kasper
Mixing: Adam Kasper, Mike Cyr and Jack Joseph Puig
Design: George Mimnaugh and Alan Narmore
Photography: John Clark and Ken Schles

References

Verbena (band) albums
1999 albums
Albums produced by Dave Grohl
Capitol Records albums